Maxwell Sydney Moulds is an Australian entomologist. The majority of  his books are written about Cicadas. Maxwell Sydney Moulds led a morphological analysis of the genus and discovered the cicadas separation naturally into clades according to biogeographical area.

Bibliography 
 Bibliography of the Australian butterflies 1773–1973.
Australian Cicadas
A Review of the Genera of Australian Cicadas
Embedding Insects and Other Specimens in Clear Plastic
The Higher Level Classification of Cicadas 
A Revision of the Cicada Genus Abricta Stål
Labelling insect specimens

References 

Australian entomologists
Living people
Year of birth missing (living people)